Odd Henrik Sælen (8 June 1920 – 23 January 2008) was a Norwegian oceanographer.

He was born in Bergen. He took the dr.philos. degree in 1963, became a professor of physical oceanography at the University of Oslo in 1965 and a fellow of the Norwegian Academy of Science and Letters in 1971. From 1978 to his retirement he served at the University of Bergen.

References

1920 births
2008 deaths
Scientists from Bergen
Academic staff of the University of Oslo
Academic staff of the University of Bergen
Norwegian oceanographers
Members of the Norwegian Academy of Science and Letters